Charles-Félix Cazeau (24 December 1807 – 26 February 1881) was a French Canadian priest and administrator of the Archdiocese of Quebec who was prominently involved in the relief of victims from the Great Irish Famine (1845-1849).

Cazeau began his classical education in 1819 at Quebec City. He studied at the Collège de Saint-Roch which had been recently founded by Bishop Joseph-Octave Plessis and one of his teachers was a future archbishop of the Archdiocese of Quebec, Charles-François Baillargeon.

References

External links
 the Catholic Encyclopedia
 

1807 births
1881 deaths
19th-century Canadian Roman Catholic priests
History of Catholicism in Quebec
People from Quebec City